Leonardo Pereira de Oliveira (born January 17, 1978) is a Brazilian footballer who plays as a midfielder. His clubs include AEP Paphos of Cyprus, FC Istres, Servette FC, FC St Gallen and Olympiakos Nicosia.

References

1978 births
Living people
Brazilian footballers
Brazilian expatriate footballers
Ligue 2 players
Cypriot First Division players
Swiss Super League players
FC Istres players
Olympiakos Nicosia players
AEP Paphos FC players
FC St. Gallen players
Servette FC players
América Futebol Clube (RN) players
União São João Esporte Clube players
Estudiantes de Mérida players
Expatriate footballers in Cyprus
Expatriate footballers in France
Expatriate footballers in Switzerland
Expatriate footballers in Venezuela
Association football midfielders
People from Campos dos Goytacazes
Sportspeople from Rio de Janeiro (state)